The Dichter des Vaderlands (Poet of the Fatherland) is an unofficial title for the Poet laureate of the Netherlands. This position was created by the Dutch newspaper NRC Handelsblad, the Nederlandse Programma Stichting and the foundation Poetry International in  January 2000. The Dichter des Vaderlands's poetry represents the spirit of the Dutch people and culture.  the current position holder is Lieke Marsman.

List of Dichters des Vaderlands
 2000–04 Gerrit Komrij
 2004–05 Simon Vinkenoog (ad interim)
 2005–09 Driek van Wissen
 2009–13 Ramsey Nasr
 2013–17 Anne Vegter
 2017-19 Ester Naomi Perquin
 2019-21 Tsead Bruinja
 2021-present Lieke Marsman

See also

 Culture of the Netherlands
 Dutch Language

External links
Dichter des Vaderlands 
Gedichtendag 
Poetry International
https://web.archive.org/web/20070929075423/http://www.kiez21.org/articles/8/kiez21-Vaessens.pdf